Jonathan Stuart Davies (born 28 October 1994) is an English middle- and long-distance runner. He represented Great Britain at the 2018 World Indoor Championships without advancing from the first round. In addition, he won two medals at the 2017 Summer Universiade. Davies is also a talented cross country runner, winning the under 23 race at the 2015 European Cross Country Championships and the senior mixed relay at the 2019 European Cross Country Championships. In 2020 JD took his maiden British title when winning the 3000m at the 2020 British Indoor Athletics Championships.

International competitions

Personal bests
Outdoor
800 metres – 1:48.94 (Stretford 2017)
1500 metres – 3:39.00 (Watford 2017)
One mile – 3:59.36 (Stirling 2020)
3000 metres – 7:45.75 (Bromley 2020)
5000 metres – 13:23.94 (Oordegem (BEL)	29 MAY 2016)
10,000 metres – 29:24.07 (Parliament Hill 2015)
3000 metres steeplechase – 9:17.46 (Chelmsford 2015)
5 kilometres – 13:44 (Armagh 2020)
10 kilometres – 29:18 (Manchester 2015)
Indoor
1500 metres – 3:47.26 (Sheffield 2018)
3000 metres – 7:50.18 (Boston 2018)
5000 metres – 13:58.04 (Birmingham 2017)

References

1994 births
Living people
English male middle-distance runners
English male long-distance runners
Universiade medalists in athletics (track and field)
Universiade silver medalists for Great Britain
Universiade bronze medalists for Great Britain
Medalists at the 2017 Summer Universiade